I & I Survived is the seventh full-length studio album by hardcore punk band Bad Brains.

This album inverts the emphasis of Bad Brains' previous albums, which stress their punk/metal/hard rock side alongside touches of reggae. In contrast, I & I Survived is a mostly instrumental offering emphasizing reggae, ska, and dub elements (including a horn section on several songs) with only occasional forays into hard rock and punk music. The voice of band vocalist H.R. does appear on the album, albeit in sampled form from previous albums.

The album includes new songs alongside completely revamped remakes of a few Bad Brains classics such as 1983's "How Low Can a Punk Get?", two versions of the Quickness classic "Gene Machine", and a dancehall reggae version of the usually mellow "I & I Survive".

Critic Todd Kristel of Allmusic.com gave the album 3-out-of-5 stars, describing it as "a solid effort even if it doesn't break a lot of new ground".

Track listing
 Jah Love (Jenifer, Miller)
 Overdub (Jenifer, Miller)
 How Low Can a Punk Get? (Jenifer, Miller)
 I & I Survive (Jenifer, Miller)
 Cowboy (Jenifer, Miller)
 Gene Machine (Jenifer, Miller)
 Ghetto (Ray Chinna Shim)
 Rally (Jenifer, Miller)
 September (Ray Chinna Shim)
 Ragga Dub (Jenifer, Miller)
 Gene Machine (remix) (Jenifer, Miller; remixed by Daryl Jenifer and Neil Robertson)
 I & I Survive (Shiner Massive Mix) (Jenifer, Miller; remixed by Will Fulton, featuring Larry "Son Shiner" Devore)

Personnel
Dr. Know – guitar & keyboards
Darryl Jenifer – bass, programming & melodica
Earl Hudson – drums
Ted Orr – Tablas
Neil Robertson, Darryl Jenifer & Dr. Know – producers

References

.

Bad Brains albums
2002 albums